The 2008 Western Illinois Leathernecks football team represented Western Illinois University as a member of the Missouri Valley Football Conference (MVFC) in the 2008 NCAA Division I FCS football season. They were led by tenth-year head coach Don Patterson and acting head coach Mark Hendrickson, who coached the team in its first seven games while Patterson underwent cancer treatment. The team played their home games at Hanson Field in Macomb, Illinois. The Leathernecks finished the season with a 6–5 record overall and a 4–4 record in conference play, tying for fourth place in the MVFC.

Schedule

References

Western Illinois
Western Illinois Leathernecks football seasons
Western Illinois Leathernecks football